IIH can refer to:

 Idiopathic intracranial hypertension
 Innovations in International Health, an innovation platform that facilitates multidisciplinary research to develop medical technologies for developing world settings
 Transcription factor II H
 Instituto de Investigaciones Históricas (Institute of Historical research), a research institute of the  National Autonomous University of Mexico
 International Institute for Hermeneutics